Reg Sefid (also Romanized as Reg Sefīd) is a village in Hendijan-e Sharqi Rural District, in the Central District of Hendijan County, Khuzestan Province, Iran. At the 2006 census, its population was 161, in 43 families.

References 

Populated places in Hendijan County